The Veterans of Foreign Wars Monument, also known as To All Who Have Served, is a monument installed outside the Oregon Department of Veterans' Affairs building in Salem, Oregon, United States. The memorial features a soldier atop a globe.

References

Monuments and memorials in Salem, Oregon
Outdoor sculptures in Salem, Oregon
Sculptures of men in Oregon
Statues in Oregon